Behruzeh Khanum (16th-century) was a consort of shah Ismail I of Persia (r. 1501–1524).

She came the Safavid harem as a slave concubine, and became a favorite of the shah, who made her his third wife.

She was captured after the Battle of Chaldiran and taken to Constantinople, where she eventually married a judge.

References

16th-century births
16th-century deaths
16th-century Iranian women
Safavid royal consorts
Safavid concubines